Spelljammer: AD&D Adventures in Space is a 1989 boxed set accessory for the Spelljammer campaign setting, part of the Advanced Dungeons & Dragons fantasy role-playing game. It supplies rules and materials for playing AD&D in space. The set was well received by critics and fans.

Contents
The Spelljammer boxed set describes rules for AD&D in outer space. The "Lorebook of the Void" booklet describes space travel, commonly known ship types, spacefaring races, and monsters. The "Concordance of Arcane Space" details fantasy combat, more rules for spaceships, celestial mechanics, travel, and variations on rules for space. The set includes cardstock sheets which provide both descriptions and deck plans for various ships, and counters for ship-to-ship combat. The set's large color maps depict two floating cities in space, a grid for space combat, and a map of the space between the planets of the Greyhawk, Forgotten Realms, and Dragonlance campaign settings, which allows player characters to travel between these settings. The set also includes guidelines for space campaigns, as well as campaign setting material.

The set details the Spelljammer helm, which any spellcasting character can use to pilot a ship through space. There are two kinds of outer space: "wildspace", which is similar to the outer space of science-fiction with some alterations to its physics, and the "phlogiston", an ocean of a unique element in which many vast crystal spheres float around. The set includes systems for designing starships and for celestial navigation, and visual displays representing planetary systems for design and space travel. It provides mechanics, counters, ship displays, and a map display for tactical engagements between spelljamming craft; the mechanics are explicitly designed to supplement role-playing, not as a stand-alone board game. The tactical engagement system includes 8½" × 11" cardstock displays for 11 types of spelljammer ships, with a color illustration of the ship and a summary of tactical combat features on one side, and deck plans with map keys on the reverse. The elves of the Spelljammer campaign are the largest political and military presence in space, having just completed a successful extermination of interstellar orcs and goblins throughout the known universe. Dwarves use huge spacefaring asteroids, honeycombed with tunnels. The lizard men and tinker gnomes (from the Dragonlance setting) are available as PCs; the beholder and the mind flayer appear as intergalactic menaces, along with a new race, the neogi. The set also contains color fold-out maps of the Spelljammer, a colossal manta-ray-shaped starship a quarter-mile long with a half-mile wingspan, and the Rock of Bral, an asteroid merchant and pirate port.

Publication history
Spelljammer was written by Jeff Grubb, with cover art by Jeff Easley and interior covers and illustrations by Jim Holloway, and was published by TSR in 1989 as a boxed set. The set included two 96-page softbound books, four full-color 22x34 map/displays, 20 color card-stock reference displays, and four colorful card-stock cut-out counter sheets.

Reception
In the January 1990 edition  of Games International (Issue 12), James Wallis was not a fan of the set, finding inconsistencies in the combat rules, saying, "The cumulative effect of these inconsistencies is to make space combat unplayable." He did find the background "imaginative and consistent, but unfortunately there is little of it." Although he admired the production values of the components, he found the book disorganized to the point of "disarray and confusion." He concluded by giving the game a poor rating of only 2 out of 5, saying, "Spelljammer may score well physically but fails mentally [...] Scavenging AD&D players who enjoy stripping tasty ideas from the carcasses of dying games may find it of interest, but I cannot recommend it to anyone else."

Ken Rolston reviewed the Spelljammer supplement for Dragon magazine #154 (February 1990). According to Rolston, the color cover of the Concordance of Arcane Space booklet "is the perfect visual precis of the epic themes of the Spelljammer role-playing universe", with its depiction of a Spelljamming ship ("a combination of a Greek war galley, Jules Verne's Nautilus, and a mammoth exotic tropical fish") and "a swashbuckling, eye-patched fantasy pirate" with a wounded mind flayer lying at his feet. He calls the gameplay physics "cheap-and-cheerful, tailor-made for swashbuckling AD&D fantasy action, with original and simple concepts that are also enormously flexible, with an appealing internal fantasy logic". The adventure and campaign potential for using the Spelljammer set "can only be measured in tons". Rolston compares the Spelljammer set to the Space: 1889 and Shadowrun games reviewed in the same column, stating that they are both "original and exciting, but they are likely to appeal to more experienced, sophisticated role-players" and "require mastery of unfamiliar game systems", but because Spelljammer is part of the AD&D game, "few new mechanics need to be mastered, and they're based on ever-so-familiar AD&D system conventions". Rolston concludes that "The Spelljammer set is a perfect evolution of the big, flexible, open-ended, and fun-loving elements of AD&D role-playing adventure. [...] The tone, objectives, and spirit are just right for its audience and purpose. The presentation is colorful and wonderfully imaginative" and "the rules and game concepts are simple, open-ended, and unpretentious, in keeping with the best traditions of AD&D role-playing, and remarkably comprehensive without intimidating in volume and detail." He writes "The Spelljammer set is a gloriously silly idea executed with spirit and imagination."

The Spelljammer set was a Gamer's Choice award-winner.

In his 1991 book Heroic Worlds, Lawrence Schick describes the Spelljammer setting as seen in the boxed set: "forget about science, because this is fantasy space: there's a magical cosmology that creates strange planetary systems, bizarre spaceships that move by magical propulsion, and space zones where spells behave in strange ways".

DieHard GameFan said that "Spelljammer is just such a fun and fantastic idea and along with Planescape and Ravenloft, it remains one of my three big campaign settings for Advanced Dungeons & Dragons and is a big part of why 2e is my favorite version of D&D."

Reviews
Jeux & Stratégie nouvelle formule #5

References

Further reading
Review: Challenge #43 (1990)

Role-playing game supplements introduced in 1989
Spelljammer supplements